Battery Point Light is a lighthouse in Crescent City, California, United States. It is registered as a California Historical Landmark, and is listed on the National Register of Historic Places as "Crescent City Lighthouse".

History
Battery Point Light was one of the first lighthouses on the California coast. Rugged mountains and unbridged rivers meant coastal travel was essential for the economic survival of this region. In 1855, Congress appropriated $15,000 for the construction of a lighthouse on the tiny islet, which is connected to Battery Point by an isthmus which is visible and can be traversed on foot at low tide. Although not included in the 1852 contract by the United States Lighthouse Service for the first eight west coast lighthouses, the Battery Point Lighthouse was actually lit ten days before the Humboldt Harbor Lighthouse, the last of the original eight to become operational. The fourth-order Fresnel lens was lit in 1856. The lighthouse was automated in 1953, and a modern  lens replaced the fourth-order Fresnel lens. Theophilis Magruder was the station's first keeper; Wayne Piland was its last before automation in 1953. The 1964 Alaska earthquake, the strongest earthquake ever recorded in the northern hemisphere, caused a tsunami. The lighthouse survived. In the following year, the modern beacon that replaced the Fresnel lens in the tower was switched off, and a flashing light at the end of the nearby breakwater served as the harbor's navigational aid. In 1982, the light in the lighthouse tower was lit again, and the Battery Point Lighthouse was listed as a private aid to navigation.

Battery Point Lighthouse and Museum
Del Norte Historical Society operates the Battery Point Lighthouse and Museum. The lighthouse is open to the public only when low tide permits access, daily from April through September with tours between 10 AM and 4 PM. October through March, the lighthouse is open for tours on weekends, from 10 AM to 4 PM. In both seasons, visits to the Battery Point Lighthouse and Island are only possible at low tides.  It is recommended that visitors research tide times before visiting, as the tide rises quickly at the point and the land bridge to the lighthouse can disappear rapidly. The museum includes the lighthouse keeper's quarters with period furniture and artifacts since the 1850s, as well as displays of maritime artifacts, photos and historical documents. Tours include a climb into the light tower.

In popular culture
At least two novels have been set at Battery Point Light. Walk Across the Sea, by Susan Fletcher, is a 2001 work of historical fiction for teens. The Lightkeeper's Daughter, by Colleen Coble, is a 2010 inspirational romance for adults.

Also, the music video for the Tim McGraw song "Not a Moment Too Soon" has scenes of McGraw next to the light on the lighthouse's top balcony and scenes of the Battery Point Light from a distance.

Gallery

See also

 List of lighthouses in the United States
 List of Museums in the North Coast (California)

References

External links 

 Del Norte Historical Society: Battery Point Lighthouse and Museum
 

Lighthouses on the National Register of Historic Places in California
Crescent City, California
Lighthouse museums in California
Museums in Del Norte County, California
Lighthouses completed in 1856
California Historical Landmarks
Buildings and structures in Del Norte County, California
History of Del Norte County, California
National Register of Historic Places in Del Norte County, California
Tidal islands of the United States